Taketoshi (written: 武敏) is a masculine Japanese given name. Notable people with the name include:

 (born 1980), Japanese baseball player
 (1926–2012), Japanese actor

Japanese masculine given names